Tia Darti Septiawati (born 24 September 1993) is an Indonesian footballer who plays a defender for Asprov Jabar and the Indonesia women's national team.

Club career
Darti has played for Asprov Jabar in Indonesia.

International career 
Darti represented Indonesia at the 2022 AFC Women's Asian Cup.

Honours

Club
Persib Putri
 Liga 1 Putri: 2019

References

External links

1993 births
Living people
People from Sumedang
Sportspeople from West Java
Indonesian women's footballers
Women's association football defenders
Indonesia women's international footballers